Chromium is claimed to be an essential element involved in the regulation of blood glucose levels within the body. More recent reviews have questioned this, however.

It is believed to interact with the low-molecular weight chromium (LMWCr) binding substance to amplify the action of insulin. Today, the use of chromium as a dietary supplement for the treatment of diabetes mellitus type 2 is still controversial.  This is because most of the clinical studies that have been conducted around chromium have been administered only for short periods of time on small sample populations, and have in turn yielded variable findings. To better understand the potential role chromium may play in the treatment of type II diabetes, long-term trials need to be conducted for the future.

History
The notion of chromium as a potential regulator of glucose metabolism began in the 1950s when Walter Mertz and his co-workers performed a series of experiments controlling the diet of rats. The experimenters subjected the rats to a chromium deficient diet, and witnessed an inability of the organisms to respond effectively to increased levels of glucose within the blood. They then included "acid-hydrolyzed porcine kidney and Brewer's yeast" in the diet of these rats, and found that the rats were now able to effectively metabolize glucose. Both the porcine kidney and Brewer's yeast were rich in chromium, and so it was from these findings that began the study of chromium as a regulator of blood glucose.

The idea of chromium being used for the treatment of type II diabetes was first sparked in the 1970s. A patient receiving total parenteral nutrition (TPN) had developed "severe signs of diabetes", and was administered chromium supplements based on previous studies that proved the effectiveness of this metal in modulating blood glucose levels. The patient was administered chromium for a total of two weeks, and by the end of this time-period, their ability to metabolize glucose had increased significantly; they also now required less insulin ("exogenous insulin requirements decreased from 45 units/day to none"). It was these experiments that were performed in the 1950s and 1970s that paved the foundation for future studies on chromium and diabetes.

In 2005, the U.S. Food and Drug Administration approved a Qualified Health Claim for chromium picolinate with a requirement for very specific label wording: "One small study suggests that chromium picolinate may reduce the risk of insulin resistance, and therefore possibly may reduce the risk of type 2 diabetes. FDA concludes, however, that the existence of such a relationship between chromium picolinate and either insulin resistance or type 2 diabetes is highly uncertain." In 2010, chromium(III) picolinate was approved by Health Canada to be used in dietary supplements. Approved labeling statements included: "...provides support for healthy glucose metabolism." The European Food Safety Authority (EFSA) approved claims in 2010 that chromium contributed to normal macronutrient metabolism and maintenance of normal blood glucose concentration.

A 2016 review of meta-analyses concluded that whereas there may be modest decreases in fasting plasma glucose or glycosylated hemoglobin that achieve statistical significance, the changes were rarely large enough to be expected to be relevant to clinical outcome.

Human studies
Looking at the results from four meta-analyses, one reported a statistically significant decrease in fasting plasma glucose levels (FPG) and a non-significant trend in lower hemoglobin A1C (HbA1C). A second reported the same, a third reported significant decreases for both measures, while a fourth reported no benefit for either. A review published in 2016 listed 53 randomized clinical trials that were included in one or more of six meta-analyses. It concluded that whereas there may be modest decreases in FPG and/or HbA1C that achieve statistical significance in some of these meta-analyses, few of the trials achieved decreases large enough to be expected to be relevant to clinical outcome.

Proposed mechanism of action
	The mode of action through which chromium aided in the regulation of blood glucose levels is poorly understood. Recently, it has been suggested that chromium interacts with the low-molecular weight chromium (LMWCr) binding substance to potentiate the action of insulin. LMWCr has a molecular weight of 1500, and is composed solely of the four amino acid residues of glycine, cysteine, aspartic acid and glutamate. It is a naturally occurring oligopeptide that has been purified from many sources: rabbit liver, porcine kidney and kidney powder, bovine liver, colostrum, dog, rat and mouse liver. Widely distributed in mammals, LMWCr is capable of tightly binding four chromic ions. The binding constant of this oligopeptide for chromium ions is very large, (K ≈ 1021 M−4), suggesting it is strong and tightly binding. LMWCr exists in its inactive or apo form within the cytosol and nucleus of insulin-sensitive cells.

When insulin concentrations within the blood rise, insulin binds to the external subunit of the insulin-receptor proteins, and induces a conformational change. This change results in the autophosphorylation of the tyrosine residue located on the internal ß-subunit of the receptor, thereby activating the receptor's kinase activity. An increase in insulin levels also signals for the movement of transferrin receptors from the vesicles of insulin-sensitive cells to the plasma membrane. Transferrin, the protein responsible for the movement of chromium through the body, binds to these receptors, and becomes internalized via the process of endocytosis. The pH of these vesicles containing the transferrin molecules is then decreased (resulting in increased acidity) by the action of ATP-driven proton pumps, and as a consequence, chromium is released from the transferrin. The free chromium within the cell is then sequestered by LMWCr. The binding of LMWCr to chromium converts it into its holo or active form, and once activated, LMWCr binds to the insulin receptors and aids in maintaining and amplifying the tyrosine kinase activity of the insulin receptors. In one experiment that was performed on bovine liver LMWCr, it was determined that LMWCr could amplify the activity of protein kinase receptors by up to seven-fold in the presence of insulin. Furthermore, evidence suggests that the action of LMWCr is most effective when it is bound to four chromic ions.

When the insulin signaling pathway is turned off, the insulin receptors on the plasma membrane relax and become inactivated. The holo-LMWCr is expelled from the cell and ultimately excreted from the body via urine. LMWCr cannot be converted back into its inactive from due to the high binding affinity of this oligopeptide for its chromium ions. As of currently, the mechanism through which apo-LMWCr is replaced within the body is unknown.

See also
 Chromium
 Chromium picolinate: a dietary supplement ingredient
 Chromium chloride: a dietary supplement ingredient
 Chromium deficiency

References

Biochemistry
Chromium
Diabetes